Danuta Rosani (born 30 April 1951) is a Polish athlete. She competed in the women's discus throw at the 1976 Summer Olympics.

References

1951 births
Living people
Athletes (track and field) at the 1976 Summer Olympics
Polish female discus throwers
Olympic athletes of Poland
Place of birth missing (living people)